The following highways are numbered 25C:

United States
 New Hampshire Route 25C
 New York State Route 25C (former)